Piacatu is a municipality in the state of São Paulo in Brazil. The population is 6,038 (2020 est.) in an area of 232 km². The elevation is 422 m. The city name is an ancient tupi-guarani language composite word meaning "good vision".

References

Municipalities in São Paulo (state)